Hail! Bright Cecilia (Z.328), also known as Ode to St. Cecilia, was composed by Henry Purcell to a text by the Irishman Nicholas Brady in 1692 in honour of the feast day of Saint Cecilia, patron saint of musicians. 

Annual celebrations of this saint's feast day (22 November) began in 1683, organised by the Musical Society of London, a group of musicians and music lovers. Welcome to all the pleasures (Z.339) was written by Purcell in 1683 and he went on to write other Cecilian pieces of which Hail! Bright Cecilia remains the best known. The first performance on 22 September 1692 at Stationers' Hall was a great success, and received an encore. It has been suggested that Purcell himself was the countertenor soloist, but this appears to be a misunderstanding of a contemporary account.

Composition
Brady's poem was derived from John Dryden's "A Song for St Cecilia's Day" of 1687.
With a text full of references to musical instruments (it is suggested that Cecilia invented the organ), the work requires a wide variety of vocal soloists and obbligato instruments. Brady extols the birth and personality of musical instruments and voices, and Purcell treats these personalities as if they were dramatic characters. The airs employ a variety of dance forms. "Hark, each tree" is a sarabande on a ground. It is a duet on a ground-bass between, vocally, soprano and bass, and instrumentally, between recorders and violins ("box and fir" are the woods used in the making of these instruments). "With that sublime celestial lay" and "Wond'rous machine" are in praise of the organ. "Thou tun'st this world" is set as a minuet. "In vain the am'rous flute" is set to a passacaglia bass. In spite of Brady's conceit of the speaking forest (it should be remembered that English organs of the period typically had wooden pipes), Purcell scored the warlike music for two brass trumpets and copper kettle drums instead of fife and (field) drum. The orchestra also includes two recorders (called flutes) with a bass flute, two oboes (called hautboys), strings and basso continuo.

Purcell is one of several composers who have written music in honour of Cecilia.

Movements 

The work consists of 13 movements.
 Symphony (overture): Introduction—Canzona—Adagio—Allegro—Grave—Allegro (repeat)
 Recitative (bass) and chorus: "Hail! Bright Cecilia"
 Duet (treble [though range would suggest alto] and bass): "Hark! hark! each tree"
 Air (countertenor): "'Tis nature's voice"
 Chorus: "Soul of the world"
 Air (soprano) and chorus: "Thou tun'st this world"
 Trio (alto, tenor and bass): "With that sublime celestial lay"
 Air (bass): "Wondrous machine!"
 Air (countertenor): "The airy violin"
 Duet (countertenor and tenor): "In vain the am'rous flute"
 Air (countertenor): "The fife and all the harmony of war"
 Duet (two basses): "Let these among themselves contest"
 Chorus: "Hail! Bright Cecilia, hail to thee"

Text

Publication
The work was edited for publication by Edward Francis Rimbault.

See also
Welcome to all the pleasures
Ode for St. Cecilia's Day (Handel)

References

External links
 , including Rimbault's introduction
 A Song for St. Cecilia's Day, 1687 by John Dryden

Odes and welcome songs by Henry Purcell
Choral compositions
1692 compositions